Judith 'Judy' Lancaster (born 1972), is a female former swimmer who competed for England.

Swimming career
Lancaster represented England in the 200 metres freestyle and the individual medley events and won a silver medal in the 4 x 200 metres freestyle relay, at the 1990 Commonwealth Games in Auckland, New Zealand. She swam for the Warrington Warriors.

References

1972 births
English female swimmers
Swimmers at the 1990 Commonwealth Games
Commonwealth Games medallists in swimming
Commonwealth Games silver medallists for England
Living people
Medallists at the 1990 Commonwealth Games